Lake Sandoval is a lake in Peru, close to the city of Puerto Maldonado, part of the Madre de Dios in the Amazon basin.

There is a touristic hike from the river Madre de Dios to the lake. On the way if you're lucky, you might see parrots, macaws and some other species from the rain forest. The lake is also known for having black caimans and giant otters.

See also
List of lakes in Peru

References
INEI, Compendio Estadistica 2007, page 26

Sandoval
Sandoval